Miss World 1958, the 8th edition of the Miss World pageant, was held on 13 October 1958 at the Lyceum Ballroom in London, United Kingdom. Penelope Anne Coelen of South Africa was crowned by Marita Lindahl of Finland at the end of the pageant. She became the second woman from Africa to win the title after Egypt in 1954.

Candidates from 20 countries participated in this year's pageant. The pageant was hosted by American Bob Russell.

Background 
The 1958 edition saw the debuts of Brazil and the returns of Norway (since 1954) and Turkey (since 1953). The eight countries have withdrawn from the competition: Austria, Egypt, Finland, Ghana and Luxembourg wouldn't participated after their respective selected delegates Elisabeth Schubel-Auer, Leila Saad, Pirkko Mannola, Janet Ohene-Agyei Boateng and Lydie Schmit for undisclosed reasons. Iceland and Tunisia withdrew from the competition after their selected delegates Hjordis Sigurvinsdóttir and Denise Orlando was unable to compete for canceled their trips, according to their directors via telegram. While Australia withdrew after their organization failed to hold a national competition.

The name of United Kingdom officially changed to Great Britain in last year.

Results

Pageant

Format 
Sometimes in the recent year when has changed quite a bit, the contestants were trimmed down to 6 semifinalists, compared to 7 in 1957 and 8 in 1955. This semifinal group size was last used in 1956 and previously to be used in 1954. The initial semifinalists were selected through a preliminary competition——first in evening gowns and later, in one-piece swimsuit (include 50% of the score for the figure in a bathing suit, according of Eade himself)——held the finals night.

Judges 
The ten judges for the final telecast were both male and female panel which included:
 Charles Jacobs – photojournalist and editor
 Oscar Santa Maria – former Brazilian politician
 Cynthia Oberholzer – South African model
 Cowan Dobson – painting artist
 Barbara Goalen – model
 Charles Eade – newspaper editor and member of the Council of the British Commonwealth Press Union
 Taina Elg – American-Finnish actress
 Stirling Moss – F1' racer
 Shakuntala Sharma – Indian Princess and fashion designer
 Claude Berr – Miss Europe committee

Contestants 

  – Michele Gouthals
  – Sônia Maria Campos
  – Marilyn Anne Keddie
  – Vinnie Ingemann
  – Claudine Auger †
  – Dagmar Herner
  – Mary Panoutospoulou
  – Lucienne Struve
  – Susan Riddell
  – Rachel Shafrir
  – Elisabetta Velinsky
  – Hisako Okuse
  – Jocelyne Lambin
  – Åse Qjeldvik
  – Penelope Anne Coelen
  – Harriet Margareta Wågström
  – Sunay Uslu
  – Eileen Elizabeth Sheridan †
  – Nancy Anne Corcoran
  – Ida Margarita Pieri

Notes

Debuts

Returns 
Last competed in 1953:
 
Last competed in 1956:

Withdrawals 
Retired
  – Krystina Zylówna

Did not compete
 
  – Elisabeth Schübel-Auer
  – Leila Saas
  – Pirkko Mannola
  – Janet Ohene-Agyei Boateng
  – Hjördís Sigurvinsdóttir
  – Lydie Schmit
  – Denise Orlando

Note 
  began competing as United Kingdom

References

External links 
 Miss World official website

Miss World
1958 in London
1958 beauty pageants
Beauty pageants in the United Kingdom
October 1958 events in the United Kingdom